The 2015 COSAFA Cup was the 15th edition of the COSAFA Cup, an international football competition consisting of national teams of member nations of the Council of Southern Africa Football Associations (COSAFA).  It was hosted by South Africa in May 2015. All matches took place in the North West province.

Participating nations

Did not enter

Venues

On 15 May 2015, COSAFA announced that fixtures would no longer be hosted at Olympia Park due to ongoing construction work and would instead be hosted by Royal Bafokeng Sports Palace in Phokeng.

Draw procedure

COSAFA described the procedure thus:

 Draw commences for GROUP ROUND  with 4 seeded teams (TZ; NAM; ZIM; LES) being placed in 1 bowl and the remaining 4 teams in the second bowl
 First ball out of seeded bowl becomes the seed for Group A and second ball is seeded in Group B, similarly with the remaining 2 balls in the seeded bowl
 We continue by drawing balls out to populate positions A3, A4 & B3, B4 
 Fixtures are populated electronically as each ball is drawn
 MC talks through the Group Round results whilst the Draw Master prepares the balls for the Quarter-Final Draw
 We now have 6 new teams plus 2 teams which read “Winner Group A” and “Winner Group B”
 The 4 seeded QF teams go into bowl 1 and the unseeded teams incl the Group round winners go into bowl 2
 The fixtures for QF are established by drawing from bowl 1 (GHANA; SA; ZAM; MOZ) followed by bowl 2 (unseeded teams) until all 4 fixtures are populated

The draw took place on 26 February 2015 and was televised by South Africa's SuperSport 4.

Group stage

Group A

Group B

Knockout stage
Ghana, South Africa, Zambia, Mozambique, Malawi and Botswana all received a bye to this stage.

Quarter-finals

 The winning quarter finalists proceed to the semi-finals.
 The losing quarter finalists proceed to the plate semi-finals.

Plate competition

Plate semi-final

Plate final

Semi-finals

Third place playoff

Final

Awards 

 Top scorer
 Sarivahy Vombola (5 goals)
Player of the Tournament
 Wangu Gome
Goalkeeper of the Tournament
 Virgil Vries
Fair Player award

References

External links
Official site

COSAFA Cup
Cosafa
Cosafa
International association football competitions hosted by South Africa